Kaçanoll River is a river in northeastern Kosovo in the Bajgora Hills near Bajgora. The river’s source is the confluence of two streams originating on the slopes of Mt. Bajrak, 1,600 m above sea level. The Kaçanoll flows southwards, nourished by streams from the Kopaonik Mountains, and ultimately flows through its namesake village of Kaçandoll. It ends in the village of Lupçi i poshtëm, where it flows into the Lab River. The 88-km2 basin and 21.5-million-m3 water flow make it suitable for hydropower and reservoir operation.

References

Rivers of Kosovo